In commutative algebra, the Rees algebra of an ideal I in a commutative ring R is defined to be The extended Rees algebra of I (which some authors refer to as the Rees algebra of I) is defined asThis construction has special interest in algebraic geometry since the projective scheme defined by the Rees algebra of an ideal in a ring is the blowing-up of the spectrum of the ring along the subscheme defined by the ideal.

Properties 
 Assume R is Noetherian; then R[It] is also Noetherian.
 If  are ideals in a Noetherian ring R, then the ring extension  is integral if and only if J is a reduction of I.
 If I is an ideal in a Noetherian ring R, then the Rees algebra of I is the quotient of the symmetric algebra of I by its torsion submodule.

Relationship with other blow-up algebras 
The associated graded ring of I may be defined asIf R is a Noetherian local ring with maximal ideal , then the special fiber ring of I is given byThe Krull dimension of the special fiber ring is called the analytic spread of I.

References

External links
What Is the Rees Algebra of a Module?
Geometry behind Rees algebra (deformation to the normal cone)

Commutative algebra
Algebraic geometry